Paw Tracks (formerly known as Soccer Stars until 2000, then Animal until 2003) was an independent record label based in Washington, D.C.

At first only records by Animal Collective were released on the label, but since 2004 it has also released records by other artists; the first was The Doldrums by Ariel Pink in October 2004. Although originally exclusively run by the members of Animal Collective, Paw Tracks is now co-owned by members of Carpark Records. A number of the artists on Paw Tracks were chosen by Animal Collective to perform at the All Tomorrow's Parties Festival 2011. The label's website features artwork by Abby Portner (sister of Animal Collective's Avey Tare and member of the Paw Tracks group Drawlings (formerly First Nation/Rings)).

Roster
 Animal Collective
 Ariel Pink
 Avey Tare
 Avey Tare & Kría Brekkan
 Black Dice
 Dent May & His Magnificent Ukulele
 Eric Copeland
 Excepter
 Jane
 Kría Brekkan
 Panda Bear
 The Peppermints
 Prince Rama
 Rings (formerly First Nation)
 Terrestrial Tones
 Tickley Feather

Soccer Stars discography
 Panda Bear – Panda Bear – 1999

Animal discography
 Avey Tare and Panda Bear – Spirit They're Gone, Spirit They've Vanished – 2000

Paw Tracks discography
 PAW1 – Animal Collective – Here Comes the Indian – 2003
 PAW2 – Panda Bear – Young Prayer – 2004
 PAW3 – Black Dice / Animal Collective – Wastered – 2004
 PAW4 – Ariel Pink's Haunted Graffiti – The Doldrums – 2004
 PAW5 – Ariel Pink's Haunted Graffiti – Worn Copy – 2005
 PAW6 – Jane – Berserker – 2005
 PAW7 – The Peppermints – Jesüs Chryst – 2005
 PAW8 – Ariel Pink's Haunted Graffiti – House Arrest – 2006
 PAW9 – Terrestrial Tones – Dead Drunk (album) – 2006
 PAW10 – First Nation – Coronation 7" – 2006
 PAW11 – First Nation – First Nation – 2006
 PAW12 – Animal Collective – Hollinndagain (Reissue) – 2006
 PAW13 – Panda Bear & Excepter – Carrots/KKKKK 12" – 2007
 PAW14 – Panda Bear – Person Pitch – 2007
 PAW15 – Avey Tare & Kría Brekkan – Pullhair Rubeye – 2007
 PAW16 – Black Dice – Roll Up / Drool 12" – 2007
 PAW17 – Panda Bear – Take Pills – 2007
 PAW17 2? – Eric Copeland – Hermaphrodite – 2007
 PAW18 – Black Dice – Load Blown – 2007
 PAW19 – Excepter – Burgers / The Punjab 12" – 2007
 PAW20 – Rings – Black Habit – 2008
 PAW21 – Excepter – Debt Dept. – 2008
 PAW22 – Tickley Feather – Tickley Feather – 2008
 PAW23 – Eric Copeland – Alien In a Garbage Dump 12" – 2008
 PAW24 – Dent May & His Magnificent Ukulele – The Good Feeling Music of Dent May & His Magnificent Ukulele – 2009
 PAW25 – Reverend Green / Drawlings – Be Good To Earth This Season / Wolfie's Christmas 7" – 2008
 PAW26 – Black Dice – REPO – 2009
 PAW27 – Eric Copeland – Alien In a Garbage Dump – 2009
 PAW28 – Excepter – Black Beach – 2009
 PAW29 – Tickley Feather – Hors D'Oeuvres – 2009
 PAW30 – Animal Collective – Campfire Songs (Reissue) – 2010
 PAW31 – Kría Brekkan – Uterus Water 7" – 2010
 PAW32 – Excepter – Presidence – 2010
 PAW33 – Panda Bear – Tomboy / Slow Motion 7" – 2010 
 PAW34 – Prince Rama – Shadow Temple – 2010
 PAW35 – Avey Tare – Down There – 2010
 PAW36 – Panda Bear – Tomboy – 2011
 PAW37 – Prince Rama – Trust Now – 2011
 PAW38 – Dent May – Fun – 2011
 PAW39 – Panda Bear – Tomboy Tomboy Expanded – 2011
 PAW40 – Dent May – Do Things – 2012
 PAW41 – Prince Rama – Top Ten Hits of the End of the World – 2012
 PAW42 – Dent May – Warm Blanket – 2013

Digital Releases
PAW Digital 1 – Panda Bear – Live at ZDB, Lisbon, Portugal, September 2004 – 2007
PAW Digital 2 – Panda Bear – You Can Count On Me / Alsatian Darn – 2010
PAW Digital 3 – Panda Bear – Last Night at the Jetty / Drone – 2010
PAW Digital 4 – Panda Bear – Surfers Hymn / Actress Remix – 2011

See also
 List of record labels

References

External links
 Paw Tracks Official Website

American independent record labels
Alternative rock record labels
Music companies based in Washington, D.C.
Animal Collective